Bernd Gröne (born 19 February 1963) is a retired road racing cyclist from Germany, who won the silver medal for West Germany in the men's individual road race at the 1988 Summer Olympics in Seoul, South Korea. He was a professional rider from 1989 to 1995. He won the German National Road Race in 1993.

Major results
Sources:
1986
 1st Stage 7 GP Tell
1987
 2nd Gran Premio della Liberazione
1988
 1st Gran Premio della Liberazione
 2nd  Road race, Olympic Games
1990
 1st Stage 14 Vuelta a España
1993
 1st  Road race, National Road Championships

References

External links
 

1963 births
Living people
People from Recklinghausen
Sportspeople from Münster (region)
German male cyclists
Cyclists at the 1984 Summer Olympics
Cyclists at the 1988 Summer Olympics
Olympic cyclists of West Germany
Olympic silver medalists for West Germany
Olympic medalists in cycling
Cyclists from North Rhine-Westphalia
German cycling road race champions
Medalists at the 1988 Summer Olympics
20th-century German people